Kubaba (in the Weidner or Esagila Chronicle), is the only queen on the Sumerian King List, which states she reigned for 100 years – roughly in the Early Dynastic III period (ca. 2500–2330 BC) of Sumerian history. A connection between her and a goddess known from Hurro-Hittite and later Luwian sources cannot be established on the account of spatial and temporal differences.

History
Kubaba is one of very few women to have ever ruled in their own right in Mesopotamian history.  Most versions of the king list place her alone in her own dynasty, the 3rd Dynasty of Kish, following the defeat of Sharrumiter of Mari, but other versions combine her with the 4th dynasty, that followed the primacy of the king of Akshak. Before becoming monarch, the king list says she was an alewife.

The Weidner Chronicle is a propagandistic letter, attempting to date the shrine of Marduk at Babylon to an early period, and purporting to show that each of the kings who had neglected its proper rites had lost the primacy of Sumer. It contains a brief account of the rise of "the house of Kubaba" occurring in the reign of Puzur-Nirah of Akshak:

"In the reign of Puzur-Nirah, king of Akšak, the freshwater fishermen of Esagila were catching fish for the meal of the great lord Marduk; the officers of the king took away the fish. The fisherman was fishing when 7 (or 8) days had passed [...] in the house of Kubaba, the tavern-keeper [...] they brought to Esagila. At that time BROKEN[4] anew for Esagila [...] Kubaba gave bread to the fisherman and gave water, she made him offer the fish to Esagila. Marduk, the king, the prince of the Apsû, favored her and said: "Let it be so!" He entrusted to Kubaba, the tavern-keeper, sovereignty over the whole world." 

Her son Puzur-Suen and grandson Ur-Zababa followed her on the throne of Sumer as the fourth Kish dynasty on the king list, in some copies as her direct successors, in others with the Akshak dynasty intervening. Ur-Zababa is also known as the king said to be reigning in Sumer during the youth of Sargon the Great of Akkad, who militarily brought much of the Near East under his control shortly afterward.

Notes

References
"The Weidner 'Chronicle' mentioning Kubaba" . From Grayson, A. K. (1975). Assyrian and Babylonian Chronicles.

 

25th-century BC Sumerian kings
25th-century BC women rulers
Kings of Kish
Sumerian kings
Ancient queens regnant
Ancient Mesopotamian women
Businesspeople in brewing
Ancient businesswomen